Tony McHale (born Anthony John Wright, Bradford, West Riding of Yorkshire) is a British actor, writer, director and producer, who is known for starring in Coronation Street and also known as a "stooge" to Jeremy Beadle on Game For A Laugh and later Beadle's About. He trained at the Rose Bruford College. He also enjoyed a long stint as a writer/story consultant/director on the top rated BBC1 soap opera EastEnders from its conception to the mid 1990s. He co-created BBC medical drama Holby City, and served as its executive producer and showrunner from 2007 to 2010.
Tony also served as a core writer on numerous other TV dramas.

Early life 
Tony McHale was born Anthony John Wright in Wibsey a suburb of Bradford in West Yorkshire. His father Gordon Wright was a police officer and road safety specialist who was awarded an MBE for his work. His mother Madeline Wright was a school teacher. He attended St Paul's Church Primary School, Buttershaw, where he passed his eleven plus and went on to Hanson Grammar School. His introduction to drama was through his mother's love of theatre, although they went infrequently, and reading plays from the school library.  He started performing in the annual school play, initially playing female roles as was expected from the boys in the lower school, before going on to play the title role in Ben Jonson's Volpone in the sixth form.  At the age of fifteen he joined the West Riding Youth Theatre. 

During his time with the Youth Theatre he played such roles as Danforth in Arthur Miller's The Crucible, Oedipus in Sophocles' Oedipus Rex, and Bagley in Peter Terson's The Apprentices. It was this experience that spurred him on to apply for drama schools. In 1969 he went on to study at the Rose Bruford College of Speech and Drama in Sidcup, Kent.

Early career 
On leaving Rose Bruford's in 1972, McHale's first professional acting job was on a TV commercial for Guinness. He then joined the Q20 Theatre Company that was based in his home town of Bradford. Primarily a children's theatre company that toured and performed in schools (he actually performed at his old primary school Buttershaw St Paul's where his mother was still a teacher), the company also did adult plays that they toured round Yorkshire. Whilst working for Q20 he landed a minor role in the cult film That'll Be The Day which was filmed on the Isle of Wight. There was never any serious thought at this time of becoming a writer, but McHale did both write and direct various productions for the Q20 company. He then went onto become a member of the Chesterfield Civic Theatre (now The Pomegranate Theatre) where he played numerous roles in straight dramas, musicals, Shakespeare, pantomimes and Old Time Musical Halls.  Here he also directed a number of productions, wrote some one act plays as well as the company's pantomime one Christmas – this was the first time he was actually paid for his writing. He returned once more to the Isle of Wight to play in the summer repertory season, playing lead roles in Doctor In The House, The Whole Truth and the farce Bed, Board and Romance. There then followed acting roles at a number of different theatres throughout the UK, including Harrogate, Birmingham, Coventry, Chester, Windsor, Malvern.  In 1976 through his then acting agents Richard Stone, he was cast as part of what became known as Attenborough's Army in the war movie A Bridge Too Far  which was filmed in Holland.  Throughout this period McHale was also performing in guest roles in various TV shows – Terry and June, The Les Dawson Show, The New Avengers, Play for Today, The Cost of Loving and Coronation Street, where he was notoriously involved in the murder of one of the show's most popular characters – Ernie Bishop. The 'resting' periods he had as an actor were filled by a variety of jobs from calling bingo to fitting carpets, from loading lorries to selling hamburgers.

In the late 70s and early 80s McHale acted in literally dozens of television commercials for such brands as Argos, Tesco, British Airways, Fray Bentos, Midland Bank, McVities, Worthington 'E', Tetley's beer, Valspar paints, Ford cars as well as more Guinness commercials. He also worked on numerous corporate films as well as directing at various drama schools.

In 1982 he was asked to appear in a hidden camera sketch for the very popular Saturday night show Game For A Laugh. He worked on a number of hidden camera stunts before the show morphed into Beadles About in 1986. He continued to work on that show until its end in 1996. In the late 80s McHale made weekly appearances on the satellite magazine programme Sky By Day, mainly as their DIY expert (he freely admits he knows nothing about DIY) and occasional presenter alongside Jenny Hanley and Tony Blackburn.

Writing and TV career 
In the 70s McHale started writing TV dramas on spec. In 1978 he was commissioned by the BBC to write an original three part thriller – Dog In The Dark.  Like so many commissioned scripts this was never produced, but it enabled him to get an introduction to the Cecily Ware Literary Agents, who are still his agents today. Various other TV dramas were developed, but none with any great success. Then because of something he heard on Capital Radio's late night phone-in show, Anna And The Doc, he decided to write a radio play, again on spec, called Get It Off Your Chest.  This was immediately commissioned by the BBC for Radio 4's Afternoon Play and was the start of a number of other radio plays throughout the earlier 80s – No Get Out Clause, Son From Soho and Still Life. It was these plays that brought his writing to the attention of Julia Smith and Tony Holland who were in the process of developing a long term drama (i.e. a soap) for the BBC.  When McHale was first introduced to the project, mid 1984, it was called East 8 and no cast was attached.  McHale became a regular writer on the show that was eventually transmitted in February 1985 with the title – EastEnders.  During his time with EastEnders he went on to storyline, story consult and also direct the programme as well as being the first writer to write 100 episodes. Other commissions soon followed. He did a number of episodes of Michael Elphick's crime drama Boon, ITV's Perfect Scoundrels, the long running police drama The Bill, the action adventure series Saracens, the comedy All Change, Lynda La Plante's Lifeboat, Casualty (for which he periodically both wrote and directed for over twenty years), Out Of Hours, Dangerfield.

From 1992 he became one of the original writers on the ill-fated Eldorado, eventually writing the last episode of the series. In 1994 he was commissioned to write an eight part thriller originally entitled Brighton Boy.  During the course of the production, McHale took over as director and the serial was transmitted the following year under the title Resort To Murder winning an award at the Cologne Film Festival.  He then went on to write on a number of films for both ITV and the BBC –  Silent Witness (An Academic Exercise, The World Cruise, The Fall Out, Closed Ranks, Running On Empty, Ghosts, Hippocratic Oath) Waking The Dead, Dalziel And Pascoe, Second Sight, Trial And Retribution, also Murphy's Law starring James Nesbitt and the six part spin off from The Bill Beech Is Back.

In 1998 McHale, along with the then head of drama series for the BBC, Mal Young, created Holby City, a spin-off from the established BBC medical drama Casualty.  McHale wrote the very first episode and continued to work as lead writer on the show for the first two series. He returned in 2006 as the show's story consultant, then took over as Executive Producer and Show Runner in 2007. The show went on to win a BAFTA for best continuing drama in 2008. McHale resigned in 2010 after  saying, "I only intended to do it for a year."  Shortly after the launch of Holby City, McHale formed his own production company Sanctuary Films. The company was commissioned by Channel 5 to produce McHale's late night hour/thriller Headless. McHale wrote and directed all ten episodes. Sanctuary Films has since gone on to produce stage shows, Internet dramas and TV commercials.

Over the last decade McHale has been involved in the development and production of dramas in India, Dubia, New Zealand and South Africa, whilst still developing ideas for British TV. He has also lectured at many institutions on TV writing, directing and producing. Recently he was script executive on the  highly original drama/reality show Murder Island, produced by STV for Channel 4.

Theatre and novels 
Although his original aim was the theatre, his theatre credits are nowhere as plentiful as his screen credits.  His radio play Still Life was adapted for the theatre in 1988 and enjoyed a short run at Hampstead. For his next theatre venture wasn't until 2007 when he directed his own musical Bloodbath The Musical. This rock musical with music by David Young and Jules Maguire, had featured in a totally different form in the TV show Headless. The show went onto have a run at the Edinburgh Fringe. Since the McHale directed All Or Nothing, a musical by Carol Harrison about the 60s mod band The Small Faces. The show toured successfully before having a short run in the West End.

McHale's first novel, a thriller entitled Beck le Street was published in 2019. His second novel, Edge of Civilisation, is scheduled to be published later this year.

Personal life 
In his second year at The Rose Bruford College McHale reunited with his once girlfriend Janet Logan, also from Bradford. They married quickly and eighteen months later had their first child Mathew Anthony, who was born on the same day that McHale was giving his first performance for the Q20 Theatre Company. Most of the early years of their marriage were spent touring from theatre town to theatre town. In 1976 they had their second child Sally Jane and the family moved into Tooting, South London, intending to establish themselves in the capital. However this lasted just over a year before they moved to Hazlemere and then Penn in Buckinghamshire, which is where they live today. Jan McHale is also a director and producer for Sanctuary Films. Mathew, having graduated from Bournemouth Film School, works in television as a producer/production manager and 1st AD.  Sally, with a degree in English from Derby University, worked for a few years as a production co-ordinator in both film and television, before having children and then joining her husband working in their own insurance company.

References

External links
 

Living people
British television directors
British television producers
British soap opera writers
Alumni of Rose Bruford College
Year of birth missing (living people)